The following is a list of spa towns in Germany.
The word Bad (English: bath) is normally used as a prefix (Bad Vilbel) or a suffix (Marienbad, Wiesbaden) to denote the town in question is a spa town. In any case, Bad as a prefix is an official designation and requires governmental authorization (which may also be suspended if a town fails to maintain the required standards).

The word Kurort is also used, meaning a place for a cure. However not all Kurorte are spa towns; there are also Kurorte which are visited for their pure air (Luftkurorte, for example).

This list is alphabetical, the states of the spa towns are added, as well as their official German category designation (Heilbad, Seebad etc.).

For seaside resorts, see List of seaside resorts in Germany.

A 
Aachen (Aachen has been officially certified as "Bad Aachen", but for alphabetical reasons usually declines to use the prefix)
 Aalen
 Ahlbeck
 Ahrenshoop, Mecklenburg-Vorpommern – Ostseeheilbad
 Alexisbad
 Altenau, Lower Saxony – Heilklimatischer Kurort
 Altenberg, Saxony – Kneippkurort
 Aulendorf

B 
 Baabe, Mecklenburg-Vorpommern – Ostseebad
 Bad Abbach, Bavaria – Mineralheilbad, Moorheilbad
 Bad Aibling, Landkreis Rosenheim, Bayern – Moorheilbad
 Bad Alexandersbad, Landkreis Wunsiedel im Fichtelgebirge, Bayern – Mineralheilbad, Moorheilbad
 Bad Arolsen, Landkreis Waldeck-Frankenberg, Hessen – Heilbad
 Bad Bayersoien, Landkreis Garmisch-Partenkirchen, Bayern – Moorheilbad
 Bad Bederkesa, Landkreis Cuxhaven, Niedersachsen – Ort mit Moor-Kurbetrieb
 Bad Bellingen, Landkreis Lörrach, Baden-Württemberg – Heilbad
 Bad Belzig, Landkreis Potsdam-Mittelmark, Brandenburg – Thermalsoleheilbad
 Bad Bentheim, Landkreis Grafschaft Bentheim, Niedersachsen – Moorheilbad, Mineralheilbad
 Bad Bergzabern, Landkreis Südliche Weinstraße, Rheinland-Pfalz – Kneippheilbad, Heilklimatischer Kurort
 Bad Berka, Landkreis Weimarer Land, Thüringen – Ort mit Heilquellenkurbetrieb
 Bad Berleburg, Kreis Siegen-Wittgenstein, Nordrhein-Westfalen – Kneippheilbad
 Bad Berneck im Fichtelgebirge, Landkreis Bayreuth, Bayern – Kneippheilbad
 Bad Bertrich, Landkreis Cochem-Zell, Rheinland-Pfalz – Thermal-Mineralheilbad
 Bad Bevensen, Landkreis Uelzen, Niedersachsen – Jod-Sole-Heilbad
 Bad Birnbach, Landkreis Rottal-Inn, Bayern – Heilbad
 Bad Blankenburg, Landkreis Saalfeld-Rudolstadt, Thüringen – Heilbad
 Bad Bocklet, Landkreis Bad Kissingen, Bayern – Mineralheilbad, Moorheilbad
 Bad Bodendorf, Stadt Sinzig, Landkreis Ahrweiler, Rheinland-Pfalz – Mineralheilbad
 Bad Bodenteich, Landkreis Uelzen, Niedersachsen – Kneippkurort
 Bad Boll, Gemeinde Bad Boll, Landkreis Göppingen, Baden-Württemberg – Heilquellen-Kurbetrieb
 Bad Brambach, Vogtlandkreis, Sachsen – Mineralheilbad
 Bad Bramstedt, Kreis Segeberg, Schleswig-Holstein – Solebad, Moorbad
 Bad Breisig, Landkreis Ahrweiler, Rheinland-Pfalz – Mineralheilbad
 Bad Brückenau, Landkreis Bad Kissingen, Bayern – Mineralheilbad, Moorheilbad
 Bad Buchau, Landkreis Biberach, Baden-Württemberg – Moorheilbad, Mineralheilbad
 Bad Camberg, Landkreis Limburg-Weilburg, Hessen – Kneippheilbad
 Bad Cannstatt, Stadt Stuttgart, Baden-Württemberg – Heilquellen-Kurbetrieb
 Bad Colberg, Landkreis Hildburghausen, Thüringen – Heilbad
 Bad Ditzenbach, Landkreis Göppingen, Baden-Württemberg – Thermal-Mineralheilbad
 Bad Doberan, Landkreis Rostock, Mecklenburg-Vorpommern – Heilbad
 Bad Driburg, Kreis Höxter, Nordrhein-Westfalen – Moorheilbad, Mineralheilbad
 Bad Düben, Landkreis Nordsachsen, Sachsen – Moorheilbad
 Bad Dürkheim, Landkreis Bad Dürkheim, Rheinland-Pfalz – Heilbad
 Bad Dürrheim, Schwarzwald-Baar-Kreis, Baden-Württemberg – Soleheilbad, Heilklimatischer Kurort, Kneippkurort
 Bad Eilsen, Landkreis Schaumburg, Niedersachsen – Ort mit Heilquellen-Kurbetrieb
 Bad Elster, Vogtlandkreis, Sachsen – Mineral- und Moorheilbad
 Bad Ems, Rhein-Lahn-Kreis, Rheinland-Pfalz – Heilbad
 Bad Emstal, Landkreis Kassel, Hessen – Mineralheilbad
 Bad Endbach, Landkreis Marburg-Biedenkopf, Hessen – Kneippheilbad
 Bad Endorf, Landkreis Rosenheim, Bayern – Jod-Thermalbad
 Bad Essen, Landkreis Osnabrück, Niedersachsen – Ort mit Sole-Kurbetrieb
 Bad Fallingbostel, Landkreis Heidekreis, Niedersachsen – Kneippheilbad
 Bad Faulenbach, Stadt Füssen, Landkreis Ostallgäu, Bayern – Mineralheilbad, Moorheilbad, Kneippkurort
 Bad Feilnbach, Landkreis Rosenheim, Bayern – Moorheilbad
 Bad Frankenhausen, Kyffhäuserkreis, Thüringen – Soleheilbad
 Bad Fredeburg, Stadt Schmallenberg, Hochsauerlandkreis, Nordrhein-Westfalen – Kneippheilbad
 Bad Freienwalde, Landkreis Märkisch-Oderland, Brandenburg – Moorheilbad
 Bad Füssing, Landkreis Passau, Bayern – Thermal-Mineralheilbad
 Bad Gandersheim, Landkreis Northeim, Niedersachsen – Heilbad
 Bad Godesberg, city of Bonn, North Rhine-Westphalia
 Bad Gögging, Stadt Neustadt an der Donau, Landkreis Kelheim, Bayern – Schwefelheilbad, Moorheilbad
 Bad Gottleuba, Stadt Bad Gottleuba-Berggießhübel, Landkreis Sächsische Schweiz-Osterzgebirge, Sachsen – Moorheilbad
 Bad Griesbach, Landkreis Passau, Bayern – Heilbad
 Bad Grönenbach, Landkreis Unterallgäu, Bayern – Kneippheilbad
 Bad Grund, Landkreis Osterode am Harz, Niedersachsen – Ort mit Heilstollen-Kurbetrieb
 Bad Harzburg, Landkreis Goslar, Niedersachsen – Soleheilbad
 Bad Heilbrunn, Landkreis Bad Tölz-Wolfratshausen, Bayern – Mineralheilbad
 Bad Hermannsborn, Stadt Bad Driburg, Kreis Höxter, Nordrhein-Westfalen – Heilquellen-Kurbetrieb
 Bad Herrenalb, Landkreis Calw, Baden-Württemberg – Mineralheilbad, Heilklimatischer Kurort
 Bad Hersfeld, Landkreis Hersfeld-Rotenburg, Hessen – Heilbad
 Bad Hindelang, Landkreis Oberallgäu, Bayern – Kneippheilbad, Heilklimatischer Kurort
 Bad Holzhausen, Stadt Preußisch Oldendorf, Kreis Minden-Lübbecke, Nordrhein-Westfalen – Heilbad
 Bad Hönningen, Landkreis Neuwied, Rheinland-Pfalz – Thermal-Mineralheilbad
 Bad Homburg vor der Höhe, Hochtaunuskreis, Hessen – Heilbad
 Bad Hopfenberg, Stadt Petershagen, Kreis Minden-Lübbecke, Nordrhein-Westfalen – Moorheilbad
 Bad Iburg, Landkreis Osnabrück, Niedersachsen – Kneippkurort
 Bad Imnau, Stadt Haigerloch, Zollernalbkreis, Baden-Württemberg – Heilquellen-Kurbetrieb
Bad Karlshafen, Landkreis Kassel, Hessen – Soleheilbad
 Bad Kissingen, Landkreis Bad Kissingen, Bayern – Heilquellen-Kurbetrieb, Moorheilbad
 Bad Klosterlausnitz, Saale-Holzland-Kreis, Thüringen - Moorheilbad
 Bad König, Odenwaldkreis, Hessen – Thermalheilbad
 Bad Königshofen im Grabfeld, Landkreis Rhön-Grabfeld, Bayern – Mineralheilbad
 Bad Kösen, Burgenlandkreis, Sachsen-Anhalt – Soleheilbad
 Bad Kötzting, Landkreis Cham, Bayern – Kneippheilbad
 Bad Kohlgrub, Landkreis Garmisch-Partenkirchen, Bayern – Moorheilbad
 Bad Kreuznach, Landkreis Bad Kreuznach, Rheinland-Pfalz – Mineralheilbad, Radonheilbad
 Bad Krozingen, Landkreis Breisgau-Hochschwarzwald, Baden-Württemberg – Mineral-Thermalheilbad
 Bad Laasphe, Kreis Siegen-Wittgenstein, Nordrhein-Westfalen – Kneippheilbad
 Bad Laer, Landkreis Osnabrück, Niedersachsen – Soleheilbad
 Bad Langensalza, Unstrut-Hainich-Kreis, Thüringen – Heilbad
 Bad Lausick, Landkreis Leipzig, Sachsen – Mineralheilbad
 Bad Lauterberg, Landkreis Osterode am Harz, Niedersachsen – Kneippheilbad
 Bad Liebenstein, Wartburgkreis, Thüringen – Mineralheilbad
 Bad Liebenwerda, Landkreis Elbe-Elster, Brandenburg – Moorheilbad
 Bad Liebenzell, Landkreis Calw, Baden-Württemberg – Heilbad
 Bad Lippspringe, Kreis Paderborn, Nordrhein-Westfalen – Heilbad, Heilklimatischer Kurort
 Bad Lobenstein, Saale-Orla-Kreis, Thüringen – Moorbad
 Bad Malente-Gremsmühlen, Gemeinde Malente, Kreis Ostholstein, Schleswig-Holstein – Kneippheilbad, Heilklimatischer Kurort
 Bad Marienberg (Westerwald), Westerwaldkreis, Rheinland-Pfalz – Kneippheilbad
 Bad Meinberg, Stadt Horn-Bad Meinberg, Kreis Lippe, Nordrhein-Westfalen – Heilbad
 Bad Mergentheim, Main-Tauber-Kreis, Baden-Württemberg – Mineralheilbad
 Bad Münder am Deister, Landkreis Hameln-Pyrmont, Niedersachsen – Ort mit Heilquellen-Kurbetrieb
 Bad Münster am Stein-Ebernburg, Landkreis Bad Kreuznach, Rheinland-Pfalz – Radonheilbad, Heilklimatischer Kurort
 Bad Münstereifel, Kreis Euskirchen, Nordrhein-Westfalen – Kneippheilbad
 Bad Muskau, Landkreis Görlitz, Sachsen – Ort mit Moorkurbetrieb
 Bad Nauheim, Wetteraukreis, Hessen – Thermal-Mineralbad
 Bad Nenndorf, Landkreis Schaumburg, Niedersachsen – Moorheilbad, Mineralheilbad
 Bad Neuenahr-Ahrweiler, Landkreis Ahrweiler, Rheinland-Pfalz – Mineralbad
 Bad Neustadt an der Saale, Landkreis Rhön-Grabfeld, Bayern – Solheilbad, Moorheilbad
 Bad Niedernau, Stadt Rottenburg am Neckar, Landkreis Tübingen, Baden-Württemberg – Mineralheilbad, Moorheilbad
 Bad Oeynhausen, Kreis Minden-Lübbecke, Nordrhein-Westfalen – Mineralheilbad
 Bad Orb, Main-Kinzig-Kreis, Hessen – Heilbad
 Bad Peterstal-Griesbach, Ortenaukreis, Baden-Württemberg – Mineralheilbad, Moorheilbad, Kneippkurort
 Bad Pyrmont, Landkreis Hameln-Pyrmont, Niedersachsen – Mineralheilbad, Moorheilbad
 Bad Rappenau, Landkreis Heilbronn, Baden-Württemberg – Soleheilbad
 Bad Reichenhall, Landkreis Berchtesgadener Land, Bayern – Soleheilbad
 Bad Rilchingen, Regionalverband Saarbrücken, Saarland - Thermalsole - Mineralbad
 Bad Rippoldsau-Schapbach, Landkreis Freudenstadt, Baden-Württemberg – Mineralbad, Moorbad
 Bad Rodach, Landkreis Coburg, Bayern – Heilbad
 Bad Rotenfels, Stadt Gaggenau, Landkreis Rastatt, Baden-Württemberg – Heilquellen-Kurbetrieb
 Bad Rothenfelde, Landkreis Osnabrück, Niedersachsen – Soleheilbad
 Bad Saarow, Gemeinde Bad Saarow-Pieskow, Landkreis Oder-Spree, Brandenburg – Thermalsoleheilbad, Moorheilbad
 Bad Sachsa, Landkreis Osterode am Harz, Niedersachsen – Heilklimatischer Kurort
 Bad Säckingen, Landkreis Waldshut, Baden-Württemberg – Heilbad
 Bad Salzdetfurth, Landkreis Hildesheim, Niedersachsen – Moorheilbad, Soleheilbad
 Bad Salzelmen, Stadt Schönebeck, Salzlandkreis, Sachsen-Anhalt – Soleheilbad
 Bad Salzhausen, Stadt Nidda, Wetteraukreis, Hessen – Heilbad
 Bad Salzig, Stadt Boppard, Rhein-Hunsrück-Kreis, Rheinland-Pfalz – Mineralheilbad
 Bad Salzschlirf, Landkreis Fulda, Hessen – Mineralheilbad, Moorheilbad
 Bad Salzuflen, Kreis Lippe, Nordrhein-Westfalen – Mineralheilbad
 Bad Salzungen, Wartburgkreis, Thüringen – Soleheilbad
 Bad Sassendorf, Kreis Soest, Nordrhein-Westfalen – Mineralheilbad, Moorheilbad
 Bad Saulgau, Landkreis Sigmaringen, Baden-Württemberg – Heilbad
 Bad Schandau, Landkreis Sächsische Schweiz-Osterzgebirge, Sachsen – Kneippkurort
 Bad Schlema, Erzgebirgskreis, Sachsen – Heilbad
 Bad Schmiedeberg, Landkreis Wittenberg, Sachsen-Anhalt – Moorheilbad, Mineralheilbad, Kneippkurort
 Bad Schönborn, Landkreis Karlsruhe, Baden-Württemberg – Heilbad
 Bad Schussenried, Landkreis Biberach, Baden-Württemberg – Moorheilbad
 Bad Schwalbach, Rheingau-Taunus-Kreis, Hessen – Mineralheilbad, Moorheilbad
 Bad Schwartau, Kreis Ostholstein, Schleswig-Holstein – Jodsoleheilbad, Moorheilbad
 Bad Sebastiansweiler, Stadt Mössingen, Landkreis Tübingen, Baden-Württemberg – Heilquellen-Kurbetrieb
 Bad Segeberg, Kreis Segeberg, Schleswig-Holstein – Mineralheilbad
 Bad Sobernheim, Landkreis Bad Kreuznach, Rheinland-Pfalz – Felkeheilbad
 Bad Soden am Taunus, Main-Taunus-Kreis, Hessen – Mineral-Soleheilbad
 Bad Soden-Salmünster, Main-Kinzig-Kreis, Hessen – Mineralheilbad
 Bad Sooden-Allendorf, Werra-Meißner-Kreis, Hessen – Soleheilbad
 Bad Staffelstein, Landkreis Lichtenfels, Bayern – Sole-Thermalbad
 Bad Steben, Landkreis Hof, Bayern – Heilbad
 Bad Suderode, Landkreis Harz, Sachsen-Anhalt – Heilbad
 Bad Sulza, Landkreis Weimarer Land, Thüringen – Soleheilbad
 Bad Sülze, Landkreis Vorpommern-Rügen, Mecklenburg-Vorpommern – Heilbad
 Bad Tabarz, Landkreis Gotha, Thüringen – Kneipp-Heilbad
 Bad Teinach, Stadt Bad Teinach-Zavelstein, Landkreis Calw, Baden-Württemberg – Heilbad
 Bad Tennstedt, Unstrut-Hainich-Kreis, Thüringen – Heilbad
 Bad Tölz, Landkreis Bad Tölz-Wolfratshausen, Bayern – Jodbad, Heilklimatischer Kurort
 Bad Überkingen, Landkreis Göppingen, Baden-Württemberg – Heilbad
 Bad Urach, Landkreis Reutlingen, Baden-Württemberg – Heilbad
 Bad Vilbel, Wetteraukreis, Hessen – Heilbad
 Bad Waldliesborn, Stadt Lippstadt, Kreis Soest, Nordrhein-Westfalen – Mineralheilbad
 Bad Waldsee, Landkreis Ravensburg, Baden-Württemberg – Moorheilbad, Kneippkurort
 Bad Westernkotten, Stadt Erwitte, Kreis Soest, Nordrhein-Westfalen – Soleheilbad, Moorheilbad
 Bad Wiessee, Bavaria – Mineralheilbad
 Bad Wildbad, Landkreis Calw, Baden-Württemberg – Thermalheilbad
 Bad Wildstein, Stadt Traben-Trarbach, Landkreis Bernkastel-Wittlich, Rheinland-Pfalz – Heilbad
 Bad Wildungen, Landkreis Waldeck-Frankenberg, Hessen – Mineralheilbad
 Bad Wilhelmshöhe, Stadt Kassel, Hessen – Thermalsoleheilbad, Kneippheilbad
 Bad Wilsnack, Landkreis Prignitz, Brandenburg – Moorheilbad
 Bad Wimpfen, Landkreis Heilbronn, Baden-Württemberg – Soleheilbad
 Bad Windsheim, Landkreis Neustadt an der Aisch-Bad Windsheim, Bayern – Soleheilbad, Mineralheilbad
 Bad Wörishofen, Landkreis Unterallgäu, Bayern – Kneippheilbad
 Bad Wünnenberg, Kreis Paderborn, Nordrhein-Westfalen – Kneippheilbad
 Bad Wurzach, Landkreis Ravensburg, Baden-Württemberg – Moorheilbad
 Bad Zwesten, Schwalm-Eder-Kreis, Hessen – Heilbad
 Bad Zwischenahn, Landkreis Ammerland, Niedersachsen – Moorheilbad
 Baden-Baden, Baden-Württemberg – Mineralheilbad
 Badenweiler, Landkreis Breisgau-Hochschwarzwald, Baden-Württemberg – Thermalheilbad
 Baltrum, Landkreis Aurich, Niedersachsen – Nordseeheilbad
 Bansin, Gemeinde Heringsdorf, Landkreis Vorpommern-Greifswald, Mecklenburg-Vorpommern – Ostseeheilbad
 Bayrischzell, Landkreis Miesbach, Bayern – Heilklimatischer Kurort
 Berchtesgaden, Landkreis Berchtesgadener Land, Bayern – Heilklimatischer Kurort
 Berg, Stadt Stuttgart, Baden-Württemberg – Heilquellen-Kurbetrieb
 Berggießhübel, Stadt Bad Gottleuba-Berggießhübel, Landkreis Sächsische Schweiz-Osterzgebirge, Sachsen – Kneippkurort
 Bernkastel-Kues, Landkreis Bernkastel-Wittlich, Rheinland-Pfalz – Heilklimatischer Kurort
 Beuren, Landkreis Esslingen, Baden-Württemberg – Erholungsort mit Heilquellen-Kurbetrieb
 Binz, Landkreis Vorpommern-Rügen, Mecklenburg-Vorpommern – Ostseebad
 Bischofsgrün, Landkreis Bayreuth, Bayern – Heilklimatischer Kurort
 Bischofswiesen, Landkreis Berchtesgadener Land, Bayern – Heilklimatischer Kurort
 Blankenburg, Unstrut-Hainich-Kreis, Thüringen – Heilbad
 Blieskastel, Saarpfalz-Kreis, Saarland – Kneippkurort
 Bodenmais, Landkreis Regen, Bayern – Heilklimatischer Kurort
 Boltenhagen, Mecklenburg-Vorpommern – Ostseeheilbad
 Borkum, Landkreis Leer, Niedersachsen – Nordseeheilbad
 Breege, Landkreis Vorpommern-Rügen, Mecklenburg-Vorpommern – Ostseebad
 Brilon, Hochsauerlandkreis, Nordrhein-Westfalen – Kneippkurort
 Buckow, Landkreis Märkisch-Oderland, Brandenburg – Kneippkurort
 Büsum, Kreis Dithmarschen, Schleswig-Holstein – Nordseeheilbad
 Burg auf Fehmarn, Stadt Fehmarn, Kreis Ostholstein, Schleswig-Holstein – Ostseeheilbad
 Burg (Spreewald), Landkreis Spree-Neiße, Brandenburg – Ort mit Heilquellenkurbetrieb
 Burhave, Gemeinde Butjadingen, Landkreis Wesermarsch, Niedersachsen – Nordseebad

C 
 Carolinensiel-Harlesiel, Stadt Wittmund, Landkreis Wittmund, Niedersachsen – Nordseebad
 Cuxhaven, Landkreis Cuxhaven, Niedersachsen – Nordseeheilbad

D 
 Dahme, Kreis Ostholstein, Schleswig-Holstein – Ostseeheilbad
 Damp, Kreis Rendsburg-Eckernförde, Schleswig-Holstein – Ostseebad
 Dangast, Stadt Varel, Landkreis Friesland, Niedersachsen – Nordseebad, Ort mit Heilquellen-Kurbetrieb
 Daun, Landkreis Vulkaneifel, Rheinland-Pfalz – Heilklimatischer Kurort, Kneippkurort, Mineralbad
 Dierhagen, Landkreis Vorpommern-Rügen, Mecklenburg-Vorpommern – Ostseeheilbad
 Dobel, Landkreis Calw, Baden-Württemberg – Heilklimatischer Kurort
 Dornumersiel, Gemeinde Dornum, Landkreis Aurich, Niedersachsen – Nordseebad

E 
 Eckenhagen, Gemeinde Reichshof, Oberbergischer Kreis, Nordrhein-Westfalen – Heilklimatischer Kurort
 Eckernförde, Kreis Rendsburg-Eckernförde, Schleswig-Holstein – Ostseebad
 Ehlscheid, Landkreis Neuwied, Rheinland-Pfalz – Heilklimatischer Kurort
 Bensersiel, Stadt Esens, Landkreis Wittmund, Niedersachsen – Nordseeheilbad
 Eutin, Kreis Ostholstein, Schleswig-Holstein – Heilklimatischer Kurort

F 
 Finsterbergen, Stadt Friedrichroda, Landkreis Gotha, Thüringen – Heilklimatischer Kurort
 Fischen im Allgäu, Landkreis Oberallgäu, Bayern – Heilklimatischer Kurort
 Freiburg im Breisgau, Baden-Württemberg Ortsbereich: An den Heilquellen – Ort mit Heilquellenkurbetrieb
 Freudenstadt, Landkreis Freudenstadt, Baden-Württemberg – Heilklimatischer Kurort, Kneippkurort
 Friedrichskoog, Kreis Dithmarschen, Schleswig-Holstein – Nordseeheilbad
 Füssen, Landkreis Ostallgäu, Bayern – Kneippkurort

G 
 Garmisch-Partenkirchen, Landkreis Garmisch-Partenkirchen, Bayern – Heilklimatischer Kurort
 Gelting, Kreis Schleswig-Flensburg, Schleswig-Holstein – Kneippkurort
 Gemünd (Schleiden), Stadt Schleiden, Kreis Euskirchen, Nordrhein-Westfalen – Kneippkurort
 Gersfeld (Rhön), Landkreis Fulda, Hessen – Kneippheilbad
 Gladenbach, Landkreis Marburg-Biedenkopf, Hessen – Kneippheilbad
 Glücksburg (Ostsee), Kreis Schleswig-Flensburg, Schleswig-Holstein – Ostseeheilbad
 Göhren, Landkreis Vorpommern-Rügen, Mecklenburg-Vorpommern – Ostseebad
 Graal-Müritz, Landkreis Rostock, Mecklenburg-Vorpommern – Ostseeheilbad
 Grafschaft, Stadt Schmallenberg, Hochsauerlandkreis, Nordrhein-Westfalen – Heilklimatischer Kurort
 Grasellenbach, Kreis Bergstraße, Hessen – Kneippheilbad
 Grömitz, Kreis Ostholstein, Schleswig-Holstein – Ostseeheilbad
 Großenbrode, Kreis Ostholstein, Schleswig-Holstein – Ostseeheilbad

H 
 Haffkrug, Gemeinde Scharbeutz, Kreis Ostholstein, Schleswig-Holstein – Ostseeheilbad
 Hahnenklee, Stadt Goslar, Landkreis Goslar, Niedersachsen – Heilklimatischer Kurort
 Hausberge, Stadt Porta Westfalica, Kreis Minden-Lübbecke, Nordrhein-Westfalen – Kneippkurort
 Heikendorf, Kreis Plön, Schleswig-Holstein – Ostseebad
 Heilbad Heiligenstadt, Landkreis Eichsfeld, Thüringen – Soleheilbad
 Heiligendamm, Stadt Bad Doberan, Landkreis Rostock, Mecklenburg-Vorpommern – Ostseeheilbad
 Heiligenhafen, Kreis Ostholstein, Schleswig-Holstein – Ostseeheilbad
 Helgoland, Kreis Pinneberg, Schleswig-Holstein – Nordseeheilbad
 Herbstein, Vogelsbergkreis, Hessen – Heilquellen-Kurbetrieb
 Heringsdorf, Landkreis Vorpommern-Greifswald, Mecklenburg-Vorpommern – Ostseeheilbad
 Hiddesen, Stadt Detmold Kreis Lippe, Nordrhein-Westfalen – Kneippkurort
 Hinterzarten, Landkreis Breisgau-Hochschwarzwald, Baden-Württemberg – Heilklimatischer Kurort
 Hitzacker, Landkreis Lüchow-Dannenberg, Niedersachsen – Kneippkurort
 Höchenschwand, Landkreis Waldshut, Baden-Württemberg – Heilklimatischer Kurort
 Hörnum (Sylt), Kreis Nordfriesland, Schleswig-Holstein – Nordseebad
 Hoheneck, Stadt Ludwigsburg, Landkreis Ludwigsburg, Baden-Württemberg – Heilquellen- Kurbetrieb
 Hohwacht (Ostsee), Kreis Plön, Schleswig-Holstein – Ostseeheilbad
 Holm, Stadt Schönberg (Holstein), Kreis Plön, Schleswig-Holstein – Heilbad
 Hopfen am See, Stadt Füssen, Landkreis Ostallgäu, Bayern – Kneippkurort
 Horumersiel-Schillig, Gemeinde Wangerland, Landkreis Friesland, Niedersachsen – Nordseeheilbad

I 
 Insel Hiddensee, Landkreis Vorpommern-Rügen, Mecklenburg-Vorpommern – Ostseebad
 Insel Poel, Landkreis Nordwestmecklenburg, Mecklenburg-Vorpommern – Ostseebad
 Isny im Allgäu, Landkreis Ravensburg, Baden-Württemberg – Heilklimatischer Kurort

J 
 Jordanbad, Stadt Biberach an der Riß, Landkreis Biberach, Baden-Württemberg – Kneippkurort
 Juist, Landkreis Aurich, Niedersachsen – Nordseeheilbad

K 
 Kampen (Sylt), Kreis Nordfriesland, Schleswig-Holstein – Nordseebad
 Karlshagen, Landkreis Vorpommern-Greifswald, Mecklenburg-Vorpommern – Ostseebad
 Kellberg, Gemeinde Thyrnau, Landkreis Passau, Bayern – Mineralquellen-Kurbetrieb
 Kellenhusen (Ostsee), Kreis Ostholstein, Schleswig-Holstein – Ostseeheilbad
 Kleve, Kreis Kleve, North Rhine-Westphalia – Mineralquelle-Kurhotel
 Königsfeld im Schwarzwald, Schwarzwald-Baar-Kreis, Baden-Württemberg – Heilklimatischer Kurort, Kneippkurort
 Königstein im Taunus, Hochtaunuskreis, Hessen – Heilklimatischer Kurort
 Koserow, Landkreis Vorpommern-Greifswald, Mecklenburg-Vorpommern – Ostseebad
 Kreuth, Landkreis Miesbach, Bayern – Heilklimatischer Kurort
 Krumbad, Stadt Krumbach (Schwaben), Landkreis Günzburg, Bayern – Peloid-Kurbetrieb + Kneippkurbetrieb
 Kühlungsborn, Landkreis Rostock, Mecklenburg-Vorpommern – Ostseeheilbad
 Kyllburg, Eifelkreis Bitburg-Prüm, Rheinland-Pfalz – Kneippkurort

L 
 Ostseebad Laboe, Kreis Plön, Schleswig-Holstein – Ostseebad
 Lahnstein, Rhein-Lahn-Kreis, Rheinland-Pfalz – Heiquellen-Kurbetrieb
 Langeoog, Landkreis Wittmund, Niedersachsen – Nordseeheilbad
 Lenzkirch, Landkreis Breisgau-Hochschwarzwald, Baden-Württemberg – Heilklimatischer Kurort
 Liegau-Augustusbad - Heiquellen
 Lindenfels, Kreis Bergstraße, Hessen – Heilklimatischer Kurort
 List (Sylt), Kreis Nordfriesland, Schleswig-Holstein – Nordseebad
 Loddin, Landkreis Vorpommern-Greifswald, Mecklenburg-Vorpommern – Ostseebad
 Lubmin, Landkreis Vorpommern-Greifswald, Mecklenburg-Vorpommern – Ostseebad

M 
 Manderscheid, Landkreis Bernkastel-Wittlich, Rheinland-Pfalz – Heilklimatischer Kurort, Kneippkurort
 Marktschellenberg, Landkreis Berchtesgadener Land, Bayern – Heilklimatischer Kurort
 Masserberg, Landkreis Hildburghausen, Thüringen – Heilklimatischer Kurort
 Mettnau, Stadt Radolfzell, Landkreis Konstanz, Baden-Württemberg – Kneippkurort
 Mölln, Kreis Herzogtum Lauenburg, Schleswig-Holstein – Kneippkurort
 Murnau am Staffelsee, Landkreis Garmisch-Partenkirchen, Bayern – Moor-Kurbetrieb

N 
 Naumburg (Hessen), Landkreis Kassel, Hessen – Kneippkurort
 Nebel, Kreis Nordfriesland, Schleswig-Holstein – Nordseebad
 Neubulach, Landkreis Calw, Baden-Württemberg – Heilklimatischer Kurort, Heilstollenkurbetrieb
 Neuharlingersiel, Landkreis Wittmund, Niedersachsen – Nordseeheilbad
 Neukirchen (Knüll), Schwalm-Eder-Kreis, Hessen – Kneippheilbad
 Neustadt in Holstein, Kreis Ostholstein, Schleswig-Holstein – Ostseebad
 Nieblum, Kreis Nordfriesland, Schleswig-Holstein – Nordseebad
 Nieheim, Kreis Höxter, Nordrhein-Westfalen – Heilklimatischer Kurort
 Niendorf (Ostsee), Timmendorfer Strand, Kreis Ostholstein, Schleswig-Holstein – Ostseeheilbad
 Nienhagen, Landkreis Rostock, Mecklenburg-Vorpommern – Ostseebad
 Nonnweiler, Landkreis Sankt Wendel, Saarland – Heilklimatischer Kurort
 Norddeich, Stadt Norden, Landkreis Aurich, Niedersachsen – Nordseeheilbad
 Norddorf auf Amrum, Kreis Nordfriesland, Schleswig-Holstein – Nordseeheilbad
 Norderney, Landkreis Aurich, Niedersachsen – Nordseeheilbad
 Nordstrand, Kreis Nordfriesland, Schleswig-Holstein – Nordseeheilbad
 Nümbrecht, Oberbergischer Kreis, Nordrhein-Westfalen – Heilklimatischer Kurort

O 
 Oberstaufen, Landkreis Oberallgäu, Bayern – Heilklimatischer Kurort, Schroth-Heilbad
 Oberstdorf, Landkreis Oberallgäu, Bayern – Heilklimatischer Kurort, Kneippkurort
 Obertal-Buhlbach, Gemeinde Baiersbronn, Landkreis Freudenstadt, Baden-Württemberg – Heilklimatischer Kurort
 Olsberg, Hochsauerlandkreis, Nordrhein-Westfalen – Kneippkurort
 Orscholz, Gemeinde Mettlach, Landkreis Merzig-Wadern, Saarland – Heilklimatischer Kurort
 Otterndorf, Landkreis Cuxhaven, Samtgemeinde Hadeln, Niedersachsen, Nordseebad
 Ottobeuren, Landkreis Unterallgäu, Bayern – Kneippkurort
 Oy-Mittelberg, Landkreis Oberallgäu, Bayern – Kneippkurort

P 
 Pellworm, Kreis Nordfriesland, Schleswig-Holstein – Nordseeheilbad
 Prerow, Landkreis Vorpommern-Rügen, Mecklenburg-Vorpommern – Ostseebad
 Prien am Chiemsee, Landkreis Rosenheim, Bayern – Kneippkurort

R 
 Ramsau bei Berchtesgaden, Landkreis Berchtesgadener Land, Bayern – Heilklimatischer Kurort
 Randringhausen, Stadt Bünde, Kreis Herford, Nordrhein-Westfalen – Erholungsort mit Kurmittelgebiet
 Rantum (Sylt), Kreis Nordfriesland, Schleswig-Holstein – Nordseebad
 Bad Reinhardshausen, Stadt Bad Wildungen, Landkreis Waldeck-Frankenberg, Hessen – Mineralheilbad
 Rengsdorf, Landkreis Neuwied, Rheinland-Pfalz – Heilklimatischer Kurort
 Rerik, Landkreis Rostock, Mecklenburg-Vorpommern – Ostseebad
 Rothenuffeln, Gemeinde Hille, Kreis Minden-Lübbecke, Nordrhein-Westfalen – Erholungsort mit Kurmittelgebiet
 Rottach-Egern, Landkreis Miesbach, Bayern – Heilklimatischer Kurort

S 
 Saig, Gemeinde Lenzkirch, Landkreis Breisgau-Hochschwarzwald, Baden-Württemberg – Heilklimatischer Kurort
 Salzgitter-Bad, Stadt Salzgitter, Niedersachsen – Ort mit Sole-Kurbetrieb
 Sasbachwalden, Ortenaukreis, Baden-Württemberg – Heilklimatischer Kurort, Kneippkurort
 Scharbeutz, Kreis Ostholstein, Schleswig-Holstein – Ostseeheilbad
 Scheidegg, Landkreis Lindau (Bodensee), Bayern – Heilklimatischer Kurort, Kneippkurort
 Schieder, Stadt Schieder-Schwalenberg, Kreis Lippe, Nordrhein-Westfalen – Kneippkurort
 Schlangenbad, Rheingau-Taunus-Kreis, Hessen – Heilbad
 Schluchsee, Landkreis Breisgau-Hochschwarzwald, Baden-Württemberg – Heilklimatischer Kurort
 Schömberg, Landkreis Calw, Baden-Württemberg – Heilklimatischer Kurort, Kneippkurort im Schwarzwald
 Schönau am Königssee, Landkreis Berchtesgadener Land, Bayern – Heilklimatischer Kurort
 Schönberg (Holstein), Kreis Plön, Schleswig-Holstein – Ostseebad
 Schönhagen, Gemeinde Brodersby, Kreis Rendsburg-Eckernförde, Schleswig-Holstein – Ostseebad
 Schönmünzach-Schwarzenberg, Gemeinde Baiersbronn, Landkreis Freudenstadt, Baden-Württemberg – Kneippkurort
 Schönwald im Schwarzwald, Schwarzwald-Baar-Kreis, Baden-Württemberg – Heilklimatischer Kurort
 Schwangau, Landkreis Ostallgäu, Bayern – Heilklimatischer Kurort
 Seebruch, Stadt Vlotho, Kreis Herford, Nordrhein-Westfalen – Luftkurort mit Kurmittelgebiet
 Sellin, Landkreis Vorpommern-Rügen, Mecklenburg-Vorpommern – Ostseebad
 Senkelteich, Stadt Vlotho, Kreis Herford, Nordrhein-Westfalen – Luftkurort mit Kurmittelgebiet
 Sibyllenbad, Marktgemeinde Bad Neualbenreuth, Landkreis Tirschenreuth, Bayern – Heilquellen-Kurbetrieb
 Siegsdorf, Landkreis Traunstein, Bayern – Heilquellenkurbetrieb
 Sierksdorf, Kreis Ostholstein, Schleswig-Holstein – Ostseebad
 Sohl, Stadt Bad Elster, Vogtlandkreis, Sachsen – Mineral- und Moorheilbad
 Soltau, Landkreis Heidekreis, Niedersachsen – Ort mit Sole-Kurbetrieb
 Spiekeroog, Landkreis Wittmund, Niedersachsen – Nordseeheilbad
 St. Blasien, Landkreis Waldshut, Baden-Württemberg – Heilklimatischer Kurort, Kneippkurort
 Sankt Peter-Ording, Kreis Nordfriesland, Schleswig-Holstein – Nordseeheilbad, Schwefelbad
 Strande, Kreis Rendsburg-Eckernförde, Schleswig-Holstein – Ostseebad
 Stützerbach, Ilm-Kreis, Thüringen – Kneippkurort
 Sülzhayn, Stadt Ellrich, Landkreis Nordhausen, Thüringen – Heilklimatischer Kurort
 Sylt-Ost, Kreis Nordfriesland, Schleswig-Holstein – Seebad

T 
 Tecklenburg, Kreis Steinfurt, Nordrhein-Westfalen – Kneippkurort
 Tegernsee, Landkreis Miesbach, Bayern – Heilklimatischer Kurort
 Templin, Landkreis Uckermark, Brandenburg – Thermalsoleheilbad
 Thiessow, Landkreis Vorpommern-Rügen, Mecklenburg-Vorpommern – Ostseebad
 Timmendorfer Strand, Kreis Ostholstein, Schleswig-Holstein – Ostseeheilbad
 Titisee-Neustadt, Landkreis Breisgau-Hochschwarzwald, Baden-Württemberg – Heilklimatischer Kurort
 Todtmoos, Landkreis Waldshut, Baden-Württemberg – Heilklimatischer Kurort
 Tossens, Gemeinde Butjadingen, Landkreis Wesermarsch, Niedersachsen – Nordseebad
 Trassenheide, Landkreis Vorpommern-Greifswald, Mecklenburg-Vorpommern – Ostseebad
 Travemünde, Stadt Lübeck, Schleswig-Holstein – Ostseeheilbad
 Treuchtlingen, Landkreis Weißenburg-Gunzenhausen, Bayern – Heilquellen-Kurbetrieb
 Triberg im Schwarzwald, Schwarzwald-Baar-Kreis, Baden-Württemberg – Heilklimatischer Kurort

U 
 Überlingen, Bodenseekreis, Baden-Württemberg – Kneippheilbad
 Ückeritz, Landkreis Vorpommern-Greifswald, Mecklenburg-Vorpommern – Ostseebad
 Ueckermünde, Landkreis Vorpommern-Greifswald, Mecklenburg-Vorpommern – Seebad
 Usseln, Gemeinde Willingen (Upland), Landkreis Waldeck-Frankenberg, Hessen – Heilklimatischer Kurort
 Utersum, Kreis Nordfriesland, Schleswig-Holstein – Nordseebad

V 
 Vallendar, Landkreis Mayen-Koblenz, Rheinland-Pfalz – Kneippkurort
 Villingen, Stadt Villingen-Schwenningen, Schwarzwald-Baar-Kreis, Baden-Württemberg – Kneippkurort

W 
 Waldbronn, Landkreis Karlsruhe, Baden-Württemberg – Heilquellen-Kurbetrieb
 Wangerooge, Landkreis Friesland, Niedersachsen – Nordseeheilbad
 Waren (Müritz), Landkreis Mecklenburgische Seenplatte, Mecklenburg-Vorpommern - Soleheilbad
 Warmbad, Stadt Wolkenstein, Erzgebirgskreis, Sachsen – Ort mit Heilquellenkurbetrieb
 Warnemünde, Stadt Rostock, Mecklenburg-Vorpommern – Ostseebad
 Weiskirchen, Landkreis Merzig-Wadern, Saarland – Heilklimatischer Kurort, Kneippkurort
 Weissenhäuser Strand, Wangels, Kreis Ostholstein, Schleswig-Holstein – Ostseebad
 Wenningstedt-Braderup (Sylt), Kreis Nordfriesland, Schleswig-Holstein – Nordseeheilbad
 Westerland, Kreis Nordfriesland, Schleswig-Holstein – Nordseeheilbad
 Wiesbaden, Hessen – Mineralbad
 Wiesenbad, Gemeinde Thermalbad Wiesenbad, Erzgebirgskreis, Sachsen (Ort mit Heilquellenkurbetrieb)
 Willingen (Upland), Landkreis Waldeck-Frankenberg, Hessen – Kneippheilbad
 Winterberg, Hochsauerlandkreis, Nordrhein-Westfalen – Heilklimatischer Kurort
 Wittdün auf Amrum, Kreis Nordfriesland, Schleswig-Holstein – Nordseeheilbad
 Wolfegg, Landkreis Ravensburg, Baden-Württemberg – Heilklimatischer Kurort
 Wremen, Landkreis Cuxhaven, Niedersachsen – Nordseebad
 Wustrow, Landkreis Vorpommern-Rügen, Mecklenburg-Vorpommern – Ostseeheilbad
 Wyk auf Föhr, Kreis Nordfriesland, Schleswig-Holstein – Nordseeheilbad

Z 
 Zempin, Landkreis Vorpommern-Greifswald, Mecklenburg-Vorpommern – Ostseebad
 Ziegenhagen, Stadt Witzenhausen, Werra-Meißner-Kreis, Hessen – Kneippkurort
 Zingst, Landkreis Vorpommern-Rügen, Mecklenburg-Vorpommern – Seeheilbad
 Zinnowitz, Landkreis Vorpommern-Greifswald, Mecklenburg-Vorpommern – Ostseeheilbad

See also 
 Tourism in Germany 
 List of spa towns

External links 

 
Spa towns
Germany